The Audie Award for Romance is one of the Audie Awards presented annually by the Audio Publishers Association (APA). It awards excellence in narration, production, and content for an audiobook romance released in a given year. It has been awarded since 2005.

Winners and finalists

2000s

2010s

2020s

References

External links 

 Audie Award winners
 Audie Awards official website

Romance
English-language literary awards
Awards established in 2005